The National Bank of Georgia may refer to:
The National Bank of Georgia (U.S.), a commercial bank located in Athens, Georgia
The National Bank of Georgia (country), the central bank of the country of Georgia